The linguistic turn was a major development in Western philosophy during the early 20th century, the most important characteristic of which is the focusing of philosophy and the other humanities primarily on the relations between language, language users, and the world.

Very different intellectual movements were associated with the "linguistic turn", although the term itself is commonly thought to have been popularised by Richard Rorty's 1967 anthology The Linguistic Turn, in which he discusses the turn towards linguistic philosophy. According to Rorty, who later dissociated himself from linguistic philosophy and analytic philosophy generally, the phrase "the linguistic turn" originated with philosopher Gustav Bergmann.

Analytic philosophy
Traditionally, the linguistic turn is taken to also mean the birth of analytic philosophy. One of the results of the linguistic turn was an increasing focus on logic and philosophy of language, and the cleavage between ideal language philosophy and ordinary language philosophy.

Frege
According to Michael Dummett, the linguistic turn can be dated to Gottlob Frege's 1884 work The Foundations of Arithmetic, specifically paragraph 62 where Frege explores the identity of a numerical proposition. 

In order to answer a Kantian question about numbers, "How are numbers given to us, granted that we have no idea or intuition of them?" Frege invokes his "context principle", stated at the beginning of the book, that only in the context of a proposition do words have meaning, and thus finds the solution to be in defining "the sense of a proposition in which a number word occurs." Thus an ontological and epistemological problem, traditionally solved along idealist lines, is instead solved along linguistic ones.

Russell and Wittgenstein
This concern for the logic of propositions and their relationship to "facts" was later taken up by the notable analytic philosopher Bertrand Russell in "On Denoting", and played a weighty role in his early work in logical atomism.

Ludwig Wittgenstein, an associate of Russell, was one of the progenitors of the linguistic turn. This follows from his ideas in his Tractatus Logico-Philosophicus that philosophical problems arise from a misunderstanding of the logic of language, and from his remarks on language games in his later work. His later work (specifically Philosophical Investigations) significantly departs from the common tenets of analytic philosophy and might be viewed as having some resonance in the post-structuralist tradition.

Quine and Kripke
W.V.O. Quine describes the historical continuity of the linguistic turn with earlier philosophy in "Two Dogmas of Empiricism": "Meaning is what essence becomes when it is divorced from the object of reference and wedded to the word."

Later in the twentieth century, philosophers like Saul Kripke in Naming and Necessity drew metaphysical conclusions from closely analyzing language.

Continental philosophy 
Decisive for the linguistic turn in the humanities were the works of yet another tradition, namely the continental structuralism of Ferdinand de Saussure, an approach introduced in his Cours de linguistique générale, published posthumously in 1916. He said language is a system of signs, comparable to writing systems, sign systems used by the deaf, and systems of symbolic rites and can therefore be studied systematically. He proposed the new science semiology—from the Greek semeion meaning the sign. It was later called semiotics, the science of signs. Prior to the work of Saussure in the early twentieth century, linguistics focused mainly on etymology, an historical analysis (also called a diachronic analysis) tracing the history of the meanings of individual words. Saussure was critical of the comparative philologists of the 19th century—basing their investigations only on Indo-European languages—whose conclusions, he said, had "no basis in reality." At that time "language was to be a "fourth natural kingdom." Saussure approached language by examining the present functioning of language (a  synchronic analysis)—a relational approach in which he looked at the "system of relations between words as the source of meanings." Saussure described the synchronic, as the static side of the science of linguistics, in contrast to the diachronic, which has to do with evolution. By comparing different languages, Saussure demonstrated that there is "no fixed bond" between the signified—for example the real chair—and the signifier—the 'chair', 'chaise', etc. Spontaneous expressions of reality are not dictated by "natural forces". Saussure demonstrated the grammatical consequences of phonetic evolution by illustrating how diachronic facts take on different forms, for example chaise 'chair' and chair 'desk', and chaire 'pulpit'. 

Structuralism was the initial outcome of Saussure's linguistic turn, which later led to poststructuralism with the input of Friedrich Nietzsche's ideas. Influential poststructuralist theorists include Judith Butler, Luce Irigaray, Julia Kristeva, Gilles Deleuze, Michel Foucault and Jacques Derrida. The power of language, more specifically of certain metahistorical tropes, in historical discourse was explored by Hayden White.

See also 
 Aretaic turn
 Cultural turn
 Formal semantics (natural language)
 Historical turn
 Semiotics
 Structural linguistics

References

Further reading
 Neil Gross (2008), Richard Rorty, The Making of an American Philosopher. The University of Chicago Press, Chicago and London.
 Richard Rorty (ed.), 1967. The Linguistic Turn: Recent Essays in Philosophical Method. The University of Chicago Press, Chicago and London.

 Rorty, Richard. 'Wittgenstein, Heidegger, and the Reification of Language.' Essays on Heidegger and Others. Cambridge: Cambridge University Press, 1991.
 Clark, Elizabeth A. (2004), History, Theory, Text: Historians and the Linguistic Turn, Harvard University Press, Cambridge, MA.
 Losonsky, Michael  (2006), Linguistic Turns in Modern Philosophy. Cambridge University Press, Cambridge and New York.
 Toews, John E. (1987), "Intellectual History after the Linguistic Turn: The Autonomy of Meaning and the Irreducibility of Experience", The American Historical Review 92/4, 879–907.
 White, Hayden (1973), Metahistory: The Historical Imagination in Nineteenth-Century Europe, Johns Hopkins University Press, Baltimore, MD.
 Cornforth, Maurice (1971), Marxism and the Linguistic Philosophy, Lawrence & Wishart, London (repr. of 1967). The classical critique from the left-wing standpoint.

External links

 
Analytic philosophy
History of linguistics
History of philosophy
Humanities
Philosophical schools and traditions
Philosophical theories
Philosophy of language